Guadagnino is a surname. Notable people with the surname include:

 Kathy Guadagnino (born 1961), American golfer
 Luca Guadagnino (born 1971), Italian director and screenwriter
 Vinny Guadagnino (born 1987), American Jersey Shore star and actor

Italian-language surnames